The 2003 Island Games were the tenth Island Games, and were held in Guernsey, from 28 June 4 to July 4, 2003.

Medal table

Sports
The sports chosen for the games were:

External links
 Guernsey 2003
 Island Games 2003

 
Island Games
Sport in Guernsey
Island Games, 2003
Island Games
International sports competitions hosted by the Channel Islands
Multi-sport events in the Channel Islands
June 2003 sports events in Europe
July 2003 sports events in Europe